The Copa de la Reina de Baloncesto 2018 was the 56th edition of the Spanish Queen's Basketball Cup. It is managed by the Spanish Basketball Federation – FEB and was held between January 19 and 21, 2018.

Qualification
Prior to the start of the season, the rules of the Spanish Basketball Federation established that the top six teams classified at the end of the first leg of the 2017–18 Liga Femenina,  would play the Competition. 

The two first qualified teams qualify directly for the semifinals.

Qualified teams

Bracket

References and notes

External links
Liga Femenina official website

2017
2017–18 in Spanish women's basketball
2017–18 in Spanish basketball cups